Robertson is a patronymic surname, meaning "son of Robert". It originated in Scotland and northern England. Notable people and companies with the surname include:

A
Rev. A. E. Robertson (1870–1958), first person to "bag" Scotlands 283 peaks
Absalom Willis Robertson (1887–1971), U.S. Senator from Virginia, father of Pat Robertson
Adam Robertson, musician with the Australian rock band Magic Dirt
Adam Robertson (Canadian politician) (died 1882), foundry owner and politician in Ontario, Canada
Alan Robertson (footballer), Scottish footballer and coach
Alan Robertson (geneticist) (1920–1989), English population geneticist
Alan Robertson (swimmer), New Zealand swimmer
Alan S. Robertson (born 1941), former member of the Wisconsin State Assembly
Alan W. Robertson (1906–1978), British philatelist
Albert Robertson (1864–1952), Canadian politician 
Alec Robertson (bowls), lawn bowls competitor for New Zealand
Alec Robertson (music critic) (1892–1982), British writer, broadcaster and music critic
Alec Robertson (rugby union) (1877–1941), Scottish rugby union player
Alex Robertson (Australian rules footballer) (1887–1915), Australian rules footballer for University
Alex Robertson (Scottish footballer) (fl. 1902–1903), Scottish footballer
Alexander Black Robertson (1847–?), politician from Ontario, Canada
Alexander Cunningham Robertson (1816–1884), British general and amateur poet
Alexander D. Robertson (1849–1921), politician from Prince Edward Island, Canada
Alexander George Morison Robertson (1867–1947), Chief Justice of the Supreme Court of Hawaii
Alexander Provan Robertson (1925–1995), Scottish mathematician
Alexander Robertson & Sons, British boat building company
Alexander Robertson (artist) (1772–1841), Scottish-American artist and co-founder of Columbian Academy of Painting
Alexander Robertson (Canadian politician) (1838–1888), lawyer and politician from Ontario, Canada
Sir Alexander Robertson (police officer) (died 1970), British police officer, Deputy Commissioner of Police of the Metropolis, 1958–1961
Alexander Robertson (MP) (1779–1856), British Member of Parliament for Grampound
Alexander Robertson (New York politician) (1825–1902), American businessman and politician
Alexander Robertson (chemist) (1896–1970), British chemist
Alexander Robertson (rugby union) (1848–1913), Scottish rugby union player
Alexander Robertson, the name of several chiefs of Clan Donnachaidh
Sir Alexander Robertson (veterinarian) (1908–1990) Scottish veterinarian
Alexander Rocke Robertson (1841–1881), Canadian politician
Alfred J. Robertson (1891–1948), American sportsman, coach, and college athletics administrator
Alfred M. Robertson (1911–1975), horse racing jockey in American Thoroughbred 
 Alice Mary Robertson, (1854–1931), second woman to be elected U.S. Representative (1921–1923)
Alison Robertson (born 1958), New Zealand writer and journalist
Allan Robertson (1815–1859), Scottish golfer
Allison Robertson (born 1979), American musician
Alvin Robertson (born 1962), former professional basketball player

AM
Amik Robertson (born 1998), American football player
Andrew N. Robertson (born 1974), British actor
Andrew Robertson (born 1994), Scottish professional footballer
Andrew Robertson (actor) (born 1941), British actor
Andrew Robertson (doctor), Australian public health doctor
Andrew Robertson (sprinter) (born 1990), British sprinter
Andrew Robertson (businessman) (1827–1890), Canadian businessman and chairman of the Montreal Harbour Commission
Andrew Robertson (engineer) (1883–1977), British mechanical engineer
Andrew Robertson (lawyer) (1815–1880), Canadian lawyer, author of legal works
Andrew Robertson (miniaturist) (1777–1845), Scottish miniaturist portrait painter
Andrew Robertson (politician) (1865–1934), Australian politician
Andy W. Robertson, editor of William Hope Hodgson's Night Lands
Angus Roberston (born 1969), Scottish politician and Deputy Leader of SNP
Anne Isabella Robertson (c1830 – 1910), writer and suffragist
Anne Robertson, Australian reality-TV participant
Anne Strachan Robertson (1910–1997), Scottish archaeologist, numismatist and writer
Archibald Robertson (painter) (1765–1835), Scottish born painter who operated the Columbian Academy of Painting in New York with his brother Alexander
Archibald Robertson (physician) (1789–1864), Scottish physician; grandfather of the bishop
Archibald Robertson (bishop) (1853–1931), Principal of King's College London and Bishop of Exeter
Archibald Robertson (atheist) (1886–1961), British atheist, son of the bishop
Archibald Thomas Robertson (1863–1934), American theologian
Archie Robertson (trade unionist) (1886–1961), English trade unionist
Archie Robertson (footballer) (1929–1978), Scottish footballer
Archie Robertson (shinty player) (born 1950), ex-shinty player
Arkim Robertson (born 1994), Grenadian basketball player
Arthur G. Robertson (1879–?), British water polo player
Arthur Robertson (athlete) (1879–1957), Scottish distance runner
Arthur Robertson (footballer) (1916–1991), Australian rules footballer for St Kilda
Arthur Scott Robertson (1911–2000), fiddle player from Shetland
Austin Robertson Jr. (born 1943), Australian rules footballer, son of Austin Sr.
Austin Robertson Sr. (1907–1988), Australian rules footballer, father of Austin Jr.

B
BA Robertson (Brian Alexander Robertson, born 1956), Scottish musician and songwriter 
Ben Robertson (journalist) (1903–1943), American author, journalist and World War II war correspondent
Ben Robertson (footballer) (born 1971), former Australian rules footballer
Ben Robertson (actor) on Executive Stress
Ben Robertson, co-author of autobiography of Domenico Cacciola
Beverly Robertson, cavalry officer in the United States Army on the Western frontier and a Confederate States Army general during the American Civil War, one of the principal commanders of Battle of White Hall
Bill Robertson (English footballer) (1923–2003), English football goalkeeper for Chelsea, Birmingham City and Stoke City
Bill Robertson (Scottish footballer) (1928–1973), Scottish football goalkeeper for Chelsea and Leyton Orient
Bill Robertson (Australian footballer) (1879–1957), Australian rules footballer for Geelong
Bill Robertson (director), Canadian film and television director, producer and screenwriter
Bill Robertson (Australian intelligence officer) (1917–2011), Australian Army officer and director of the Australian Secret Intelligence Service
Bob Robertson, former Major League Baseball first baseman.
Bob Robertson (ice hockey) (born 1927), former Canadian hockey player
Bob Robertson (comedian), Canadian comedian
Bob Robertson (announcer) (1929–2020), retired sports announcer for Washington State University
Bob Robertson, alias name of Sergio Leone, Italian film director
Bob Robertson (bowls) (1926–2019), England international lawn bowler
Brian Robertson, 1st Baron Robertson of Oakridge (1896–1974), British World War II general, later Chairman of the British Transport Commission
Brian James (guitarist) (Brian Robertson, born 1950), English punk rock guitarist formerly of The Damned and The Lords of the New Church
Brian Robertson (guitarist) (born 1956), Scottish guitarist
Brian Robertson (rugby union) (born 1959), Scottish rugby union player and coach
Brian Robertson (born 1979), American trombonist with the band Suburban Legends
Britt Robertson (born 1990), American actress
Bruce Robertson (judge) (born 1944), New Zealand judge
Bruce Robertson (swimmer) (born 1953), Canadian Olympic Games swimmer
Bruce Robertson (rugby) (born 1952), All Blacks New Zealand rugby player
Bruce Robertson (rower) (born 1962), Canadian rower
Bruce Robertson, anti-hero of the novel Filth by Irvine Welsh
Bruce Robertson, creator of the Bookseller/Diagram Prize for Oddest Title of the Year
Bryan Robertson (1925–2002), English curator and arts manager

C
Charles Graham Robertson (1879–1954), English recipient of the Victoria Cross
Charles Grant Robertson (1869–1948), British academic historian
Charles Franklin Robertson (1835–1886), bishop of Missouri in the Episcopal Church
Charles John Robertson (1798–1830), English botanical illustrator
Charles Martin Robertson (1911–2004), British classical scholar and poet
Charles R. Robertson (1889–1951), U.S. Republican politician
Charles Robertson (Green Wing)
Charles Robertson (Norwegian politician) (1875–1958), Norwegian Minister of Trade, 1926–1928
Charles Robertson (UK politician) (1874–1968), Chair of London County Council
Charles Robertson (priest) (1873–1946), Anglican priest
Charles Robertson (entomologist) (1858–1935), American entomologist
Charles Robertson (painter) (1844–1891), English painter and engraver
Charles T. Robertson Jr. (born 1946), U.S. Air Force general
Charles Victor Robertson (1882–1951), New Zealand – Australian businessman, politician and educator
Charlie Robertson (mayor) (1934–2017), American politician and mayor of York, Pennsylvania
Charlie Robertson (1896–1984), American Major League Baseball pitcher
Charlie Robertson (footballer) (1873–1940), Australian rules footballer
Chris Robertson (squash player), former professional squash player from Australia
Chris Robertson (footballer, born 1914) (1914–1995), English football defender (Grimsby Town)
Chris Robertson (footballer, born 1957), Scottish football striker (Rangers, Heart of Midlothian)
Chris Robertson (footballer, born 1986), Scottish football defender (Port Vale, Ross County)
Chris Robertson (American football), American football coach
Christopher T. Robertson (born 1975), legal academic (University of Arizona)
Chuck Robertson, lead singer of the ska punk band Mad Caddies
Cliff Robertson (1923–2011), American actor
Clive Robertson (actor) (born 1965), British actor
Clive Robertson (artist) (born 1946), British-born Canadian artist
Clive Robertson (broadcaster) (born 1945), Australian journalist
Colin McLeod Robertson (1870–1951), British sailor
Colin Robertson (fur trader) (1783–1842), Canadian fur trader and political figure
Colin Robertson (cricketer) (born 1963), Zimbabwean cricketer
Colin Robertson (diplomat) (born 1954), Canadian diplomat
Colin Robertson (footballer) (born 1957), Australian rules footballer
Colin Robertson (political activist) (born 1983), Scottish far-right polemicist and public speaker
Connor Robertson (born 1981), American baseball player
Craig Robertson (footballer) (born 1963), Scottish former football player and coach
Craig Robertson (American football) (born 1988), American football linebacker
Craig Robertson (writer), see Bouchercon XLVII

D
 Daniel Robertson (outfielder) (born 1985), baseball outfielder
 Daniel Robertson (shortstop) (born 1994), baseball shortstop
 Daniel Robertson (architect) (died 1849), architect
 Daniel Robertson (colonial administrator) (1813–1892), British colonial administrator
 Daniel Robertson (British Army officer) (1730s–1819), British soldier
Dave Robertson (Massachusetts politician), state representative
David Allan Robertson (1880–1961), American academic and college administrator
David B. Robertson, Michigan state senator
David C. Robertson (born 1960), American computer scientist and organizational theorist
David Robertson (Canadian politician) (1841–1912), MPP
David Robertson (British politician) (1890–1970), British politician; former conservative MP for Streatham and Caithness and Sutherland
David Robertson, 1st Baron Marjoribanks (1797–1873), Scottish stockbroker and politician
David Robertson (footballer, born 1900) (1900–1985), Scottish-American association footballer for Kilmarnock, Queen of the South, Brooklyn Wanderers, Bethlehem Steel & U.S. national team
David Robertson (footballer, born 1906) (1906–?), Scottish footballer with York City
David Robertson (footballer, born 1968), Scottish footballer with Aberdeen, Rangers and Scotland national team
David Robertson (footballer, born 1986), Scottish footballer with Dundee United, St Johnstone and Cowdenbeath
David Robertson (Australian footballer) (born 1962), Collingwood and Essendon player
David Robertson (golfer) (1869–1937), Scottish bronze medallist at the 1900 Summer Olympics in Paris
David Robertson (cricketer) (born 1959), Australian cricketer
David Robertson (cyclist) (1883–1963), British Olympic cyclist
David Robertson (baseball) (born 1985), Major League Baseball player
Dave Robertson (baseball) (1889–1970), baseball player
Dave Robertson (football manager) (born 1973), football manager and coach
David Robertson (naturalist) (1806–1896), founder of Millport Marine Biological Station
David Robertson (architect) (1834–1925), Scottish architect
David Robertson (broadcaster) (born 1965), British journalist and newsreader for BBC Scotland
David Robertson (conductor) (born 1958), American conductor; music director of the St. Louis Symphony and the Sydney Symphony Orchestra
David Robertson (minister) (born 1962), Scottish minister and author
David Robertson (writer) (born 1977), Canadian graphic novelist and writer
David Robertson (engineer) (1875–1941), professor of electrical engineering
Denise Robertson (1932–2016), British writer and television broadcaster
Dennis Robertson (economist) (1890–1963), English economist
Dennis Robertson (ice hockey) (born 1991), Canadian ice hockey defenceman
Dennis Robertson (politician) (born 1956), Former SNP MSP for Aberdeenshire West
Derek Robertson (artist) (born 1967), Scottish artist
 Derek Robertson (politician), Australian politician
 Derek Robertson (footballer) (1949–2015), Scottish footballer

DI
Dick Robertson (songwriter) (1903–1979), American big band singer of the 1920s
Dick Robertson (baseball) (1891–1944), American baseball pitcher
Dick Robertson (footballer) (1877–1936), Australian rules footballer
Digger Robertson (1861–1938), Australian batsman, played for Victoria and in California
 Don Robertson (author) (1929–1999), American novelist
 Don Robertson (baseball) (1930–2014), former Major League Baseball player
 Don Robertson (composer) (born 1942), American composer
 Don Robertson (golfer) See Northern Texas PGA Championship
 Don Robertson (songwriter) (1922–2015), American songwriter and pianist
 Don Robertson (referee) (born 1987), Association football referee
 Don Robertson (television announcer) (1928–2021), American television sports announcer
Donald Robertson (New Zealand) (1860–1942), Public Service Commissioner in New Zealand
Donald Robertson (athlete) (1905–1949), Scottish athlete
Donald Robertson (producer) (born 1973), hip-hop producer and entrepreneur
Donald Struan Robertson (1885–1961), classical scholar at the University of Cambridge
Donald Robertson (politician), Canadian politician
Donald Robertson (artist) (born 1962), artist/illustrator and creative director for Esteé Lauder Companies
Donald Robertson (referee) (born 1987), Scottish football referee
Donald Robertson (writer) (1930–1995), wrote for Thunderbirds
Donna Robertson (born 1969), Scottish judoka and wrester
Dorothy Robertson (died 1979), New Zealand artist
Doug Robertson (footballer) (fl. 1959–1966), Scottish footballer for Dumbarton
Dougal Robertson (1924–1991), Scottish author and sailor; survived 38 days stranded at sea with his family
Dougie Robertson (born 1963), Scottish footballer for Greenock Morton
Douglas Argyll Robertson (1837–1909), Scottish ophthalmologist

E
Eben William Robertson (1815–1874), British historian
Eck Robertson (1887–1975), American fiddle player
Ed Robertson (born 1970), Canadian lead singer of Barenaked Ladies
Eddie Robertson (1935–1981), Scottish footballer; known as "Dagger"
Edith Anne Robertson (1883–1973), Scottish poet who wrote in both English and Scots
Edmund F. Robertson (born 1943), Scottish mathematician
Edmund Robertson, 1st Baron Lochee (1845–1911), Scottish barrister, academic and politician
Edward Albert Robertson (1929–1991), Australian politician; best known as Ted Robertson
Edward C. Robertson (died 1903), American football player and coach
Edward D. Robertson Jr. (born 1952), chief justice of Missouri Supreme Court
Edward Robertson (Semitic scholar) (1879–1964), Scottish academic
Edward V. Robertson (1881–1963), United States Senator from Wyoming
Edward White Robertson (1823–1887), United States Representative from Louisiana
Elijah Sterling Clack Robertson (1820–1879), early settler in Texas, signed the Texas Order of Secession in 1861
Eric Robertson (literary critic), professor at Royal Holloway, University of London
Eric Robertson (athlete) (1892–1975), British athlete
Eric Robertson (composer) (born 1948), Scottish composer, organist, pianist, and record producer
Eric Sutherland Robertson (1857–1926), Scottish man of letters, academic in India, and clergyman
Erik Robertson (born 1984), American football guard

F
Fanny Robertson (1765–1855), born Frances Mary Ross, actress (stage name Mrs. T. Robertson), theatre manager and playwright.
Fiona Robertson (born 1969), Scottish judoka and wrester
Fred Robertson (1911–1997), ice hockey player
Frederick Robertson (judge) (1854–1918), judge and academic administrator
Frederick Robertson (cricketer) (1843–1920), English cricketer
Frederick Robertson (politician) (1909–2002), member of the Canadian House of Commons
Frederick William Robertson (1816–1853), English divine

G
G. Robertson, codename for Robert Hanssen (born 1944), former FBI agent and Soviet/Russian spy
Gary Robertson (author), Scottish poet and author
Gary Robertson (cricketer) (born 1960), New Zealand cricketer
Gary Robertson (rower) (born 1950), New Zealand rower
Gavin Robertson (born 1966), Australian cricketer
Geoffrey Robertson (born 1946), Australian-born lawyer, author, and broadcaster
George André Robertson (1929–2007), British educator and cricketer
George Croom Robertson (1842–1892), Scottish philosopher
George G. Robertson (active since 1972), American information visualization expert
George Morison Robertson (1821–1867), Hawaiian politician
George R. Robertson (1933–2023), American actor
George Robertson (congressman) (1790–1874), U.S. Representative from Kentucky
George Robertson, Baron Robertson of Port Ellen (born 1946), UK Defence Secretary, NATO Secretary-General
George Robertson (bobsleigh) (born 1958), British Olympic bobsledder
George Robertson (cricketer) (1842–1895), Australian cricketer
George Robertson (footballer, born 1883) (1883–?), Scottish footballer, played for Clyde, Blackburn Rovers and Birmingham
George Robertson (rugby league), Australian rugby league footballer
George Robertson (writer) (c. 1750 – 1832), Scottish topographical, agricultural and genealogical writer
George Robertson (bookseller) (1825–1898), Scottish-Australian bookseller
George Robertson (publisher) (1860–1933), Scottish-Australian publisher; founder of Angus & Robertson
George Robertson (footballer, born 1885) (1885–1937), Scottish footballer, played for Motherwell, Sheffield Wednesday, East Fife and Scotland
George Robertson (footballer, born 1915) (1915–2006), Scottish footballer, played for Kilmarnock and Scotland
George Robertson (footballer, born 1930) (1930–2003), Scottish footballer, played for Plymouth Argyle
George Robertson (ice hockey) (1927–2021), hockey player
George Robertson (racing driver) (1884–1955), American racing driver
George Robertson (rugby union) (1859–1920), New Zealand rugby union footballer
George Robertson (swimmer) (active in 1920), British swimmer
George S. Robertson (1872–1967), British athlete
George Scott Robertson (1852–1916), British soldier, author, and administrator
George W. Robertson (1838–1906), New York politician
George Wilson Robertson (1889–1963), politician in Saskatchewan, Canada
Gordon P. Robertson (born 1958), co-host on The 700 Club
Gordon Robertson (cricketer) (1909–1983), New Zealand cricketer
Gordon Robertson (ice hockey) (1926–2019), Canadian ice hockey player
Graeme Robertson (Australian footballer) (born 1952), Australian rules footballer
Graeme Robertson (RAF officer) (born 1945), RAF commander
Graeme Robertson (Scottish footballer) (born 1962), Scottish footballer
Graham Robertson (filmmaker) (born 1973), American filmmaker
Graham Robertson (bowls), Scottish international indoor and lawn bowler
 Gregor Robertson (footballer) (born 1984), Scottish footballer
 Gregor Robertson (politician) (born 1964), Canadian politician

H
Hamza Robertson (born 1982), English singer
Harry J. Robertson (1896–1962), American football player and coach
Harry Robertson (folk singer) (1923–1995), Australian folk-singer/songwriter, poet and activist
Harry Robertson (musician) (1932–1996), Scottish musician
Harry Robertson (painter) (born 1943)
Hezekiah D. Robertson (1826–1870), New York politician
Horace Robertson (1894–1960), Australian Lieutenant General
Howard P. Robertson (1903–1961), American mathematician
Howard Robertson (architect) (1888–1963), architect of the Shell Centre
Howard W. Robertson (1947–2021), American poet
Hugh A. Robertson (1932–1988), American film director and editor
Hugh C. Robertson (1845–1908), American studio potter
Hugh Robertson (basketball) (born 1989), American basketball player
Hugh Robertson (instrument maker) (1730–1822), Scottish instrument maker
Hugh Robertson (1890s footballer), Scottish footballer for Burnley, Lincoln City, Leicester Fosse
Hugh Robertson (footballer, born 1939) (1939–2010), Scottish footballer
Hugh Robertson (footballer, born 1975), Scottish footballer
Hugh Robertson (politician) (born 1962), British politician

I
Ian Duncan Robertson, British engineer
 Ian Robertson (rugby union, born 1945), Scottish rugby union player and commentator 
 Ian Robertson (Australian rules footballer) (born 1946), football commentator and former Australian rules footballer
 Ian Robertson (rugby union, born 1951), Australian rugby union player
 Ian Robertson (rugby union, born 1950) (1950–2015), South African rugby union player
 Ian Robertson (footballer, born 1966), Scottish former football player
 Ian Robertson (Gaelic footballer) (fl. 1993–2004), Irish Gaelic football player
 Ian Robertson (Scottish footballer), Scottish footballer
 Ian Robertson, Lord Robertson (1912–2005), Senator of the College of Justice in Scotland
 Ian Robertson (British Army officer) (1913–2010), British general
 Ian Robertson (Royal Navy officer) (1922–2012), British admiral
 Ian Robertson Porteous (1930–2011), Scottish mathematician
 Ian Robertson (businessman) (born 1958), automotive executive working for the BMW Group
 Ian Robertson (psychologist) (born 1951), professor of psychology at Trinity College, Dublin
 Iain Robertson (born 1981), Scottish actor

J
J. G. Robertson (1859–1940), British singer and actor
J. M. Robertson (1856–1933), British journalist and Liberal MP for Tyneside 1906–1918
J. R. Robertson (1867–1928), educator and Freemason in South Australia
Jack Robertson (English cricketer) (1917–1996), English cricketer
Jack Robertson (footballer, born 1889) (1889–1975), Australian rules footballer for Melbourne, 1909 to 1913
Jack Robertson (footballer, born 1902) (1902–1972), Australian rules footballer for Melbourne, 1923 to 1924
Jack Robertson (footballer, born 1909) (1909–1939), Australian rules footballer
Jack Robertson (politician) (1928–1971), provincial politician from Alberta, Canada
Jack Robertson (Scottish footballer) (1875–1923)
Jack Robertson (South African cricketer) (1906–1985), South African test cricketer
Jackie Robertson (1928–2014), Scottish professional footballer
Jake Robertson (born 1989), New Zealand distance runner
James Alexander Robertson (1873–1939), American academic historian, archivist, translator and bibliographer
James B. A. Robertson (1871–1938), American lawyer and governor of Oklahoma
James Burton Robertson (1800–1877), historian
James Craigie Robertson (1813–1882), Scottish Anglican churchman and historian
James Edwin Robertson (1840–1915), Canadian physician and politician
James D. Robertson (1931–2010), Scottish painter and senior lecturer at the Glasgow School of Art
James Duncan Robertson (1912–1993), Scottish professor of zoology
James I. Robertson Jr. (1930–2019), scholar on the American Civil War and professor at Virginia Tech
James Logie Robertson (1846–1922), literary scholar, editor and author
James Madison Robertson (died 1891), artillery officer in the United States Army
James N. Robertson (1913–1990), member of the Pennsylvania House of Representatives
James Napier Robertson (born 1982), New Zealand writer, film director and producer
James Peter Robertson (1883–1917), Canadian recipient of the Victoria Cross
James Robertson (photographer) (1813–1888), English photographer and gem and coin engraver
James Robertson (conductor) (1912–1991), English conductor and musical director of Sadler's Wells Opera
James Robertson (novelist) (born 1958), Scottish novelist and poet
James Robertson (orientalist) (1714–1795), Scottish minister, professor
James Robertson (British Army officer) (1717–1788), civil governor of the Province of New York, 1779–1783
James Robertson (Australian Army officer) (1878–1951), Australian Army officer
James Robertson, Baron Robertson (1845–1909), Scottish judge and Conservative politician
James Robertson (judge) (1938–2019), United States federal judge
James Robertson (Jamaican politician) (born 1966), Minister of Mining and Energy 2009 -May 2011
James Robertson (Trotskyist) (1928–2019), National Chairman of the Spartacist League of the United States
James Robertson (footballer, born 1873) (1873–?), footballer (place of birth unknown)
James Robertson (footballer, born 1929) (1929–2015), Scottish footballer who played as a winger
James Robertson (soccer) (1891–1948), U.S. soccer full back
James Robertson (rugby union, born 1883) (1883–?), Scottish international rugby union player
James Robertson (rugby union, born 1854) (1854–1900), Scottish rugby union player
James Robertson (cricketer, born 1850) (1850–1927), Scottish cricketer
James Robertson (cricketer, born 1844) (1844–1877), English cricketer
James Robertson (activist) (born 1928), British-born political and economic thinker and activist
James Robertson (explorer) (1742–1814), explorer and pioneer in what is now the State of Tennessee
James Robertson (grocer) (c. 1831 – 1914), founder of Robertson's, a UK brand of marmalades and jams
James Robertson (monk) (1758–1820), Scottish Benedictine monk and British Napoleonic War intelligence agent
James Robertson (psychoanalyst) (1911–1988), psychiatric social worker and psychoanalyst
James Robertson (surveyor) (1753–1829), Scottish mapmaker in Jamaica
James Robertson (moderator) (1803–1860), Scottish minister and Moderator of the General Assembly of the Church of Scotland
James Robertson Automobiles manufactured the Robertson in Manchester in 1914
James William Robertson (1826–1876), first mayor of Queenstown, New Zealand
James Wilson Robertson (educator) (1857–1930), Canada's first Commissioner of Agriculture and Dairying
James Wilson Robertson (1899–1983), last British Head of Nigeria
Jamie Robertson (born 1981), film score composer from England
Jaquelin T. Robertson (1933–2020), American architect
Jason Robertson (activist) (1980–2003), American AIDS activist
Jason Robertson (ice hockey) (born 1999), American ice hockey player
Jason Robertson (rugby union) (born 1994), New Zealand rugby union player

JE
Jean Forbes-Robertson (1905–1962), British actress
Jean Robertson Burnet (1920–2009), Canadian academic's maiden name
Jean Robertson-Holley (née Jean Robertson), a fictional character from Unclaimed
Jean McKenzie (Jean Robertson McKenzie, 1901–1964), New Zealand diplomat
Jean Robertson, a character and teratology of novels from Jane Duncan
Jeannie Robertson (1908–1975), Scottish folk singer
Jennie Smillie Robertson (1878–1981), Canadian physician
Jennifer Ellen Robertson on List of Guggenheim Fellowships awarded in 2011
Jennifer Kathleen Margaret Robertson, heir to Quadriga cryptocurrency fund
Jennifer Robertson, Canadian actress, also known as Jenn
Jennifer Robertson (athlete) in 1989 IAAF World Cross Country Championships – Junior women's race
Jennifer Robertson, character in A Smile Like Yours
Jennifer Robertson, character in The Seán Cullen Show
Jenny Robertson, character in Jenny Robertson, Your Friend is not Coming, story in Free Love and Other Stories
Jenny Robertson, character in Attack of the Herbals
Jerome B. Robertson (1815–1890), doctor, Indian fighter, Texas politician and general
Jerry Robertson (baseball) (1943–1996), Major League Baseball pitcher
Jerry Robertson (racing driver) (born 1962), NASCAR driver
Jim Robertson (baseball) (1928–2015), Major League Baseball catcher
Jim Robertson (American football), American football player at Dartmouth College (1919–1921), coach at Oglethorpe University
Jim Robertson (British Army officer) (1910–2004), British Army officer who commanded the 17th Gurkha Division
Jim Robertson (footballer) (1903–1985), Australian footballer who played with Carlton in the VFL
Jim Robertson (politician) (born 1945), Australian politician in the Northern Territory Legislative Assembly
Jimmy Robertson (snooker player) (born 1986), English snooker player
Jimmy Robertson (footballer, born 1944), Scottish footballer who played for Scotland
Jimmy Robertson (footballer, born 1955), Scottish footballer who played as a left winger
Jimmy Robertson (American football) (1901–1974), American football player, coach at Geneva College (1933)
Jimmy Robertson (footballer, born 1880) (1880–?), Scottish footballer who played as an inside right
Jimmy Robertson (footballer, born 1885) (1885–1968), Scottish football forward (Blackburn Rovers, Falkirk)
Jimmy Robertson (footballer, born 1909) (1909–1979), Scottish footballer who played for Scotland
Jimmy Robertson (footballer, born 1913) (1913–?), for Bradford City

JO
Jocky Robertson (1926–2004), Scottish footballer who played for Third Lanark and Berwick Rangers
Joe Robertson (footballer) (born 1977), Scottish footballer
Joe Robertson (ice hockey) (born 1948), Canadian hockey player
John A. Robertson (1943–2017), American writer and lecturer on law and bioethics
John Alexander Robertson (1913–1965), Canadian Senator
John Argyll Robertson (1800–1855), Scottish surgeon
John Brownlee Robertson (1809–1892), politician from Connecticut
John C. Robertson (1848–1913), English-American contractor and builder
John Charles Robertson (army officer) (1894–1942), Australian Army officer
John Dill Robertson (1871–1931), medical professional and politician
John Duff Robertson (1873–1939), politician in Saskatchewan
John F. Robertson (1841–1905), merchant, ship broker and political figure on Prince Edward Island
John George Robertson (1867–1933), Scottish-born professor of German language and literature
John H. Robertson (1870s), circus owner
John Harry Robertson (1923–2003), crystallographer
John Hartley Robertson, Special Forces Green Beret Master Sgt. and subject of the 2013 Canadian documentary film Unclaimed
John Holland Robertson (died 1909), of Robertson brothers, pioneers of South Australia
John Home Robertson (born 1948), former MP and MSP
John Monteath Robertson (1900–1989), Scottish chemist and crystallographer
John Murray Robertson (1844–1901), Scottish architect
John Parish Robertson (1792–1843), Scottish merchant and author
John Rae Robertson (1893–1956), better known as Rae Robertson, of the classical musical duo Bartlett and Robertson
John Robertson (American football) (born 1993), American football quarterback
John Robertson (Australian footballer) (1940–2001), Australian footballer, who played for Hawthorn
John Robertson (Bothwell MP) (1867–1926), MP for Bothwell, Lanarkshire 1919–1926
John Robertson (Berwick MP) (1898–1955), Labour Party MP 1945–1951 for Berwick and Haddington, then Berwick and East Lothian
John Reid (British Army officer) (aka John Robertson, 1721–1807), British army general and founder of the chair of music at the University of Edinburgh
John Robertson (Canadian politician) (1799–1876), Scottish born member of the Canadian Senate from 1867
John Robertson (comedian) (born 1985), comedian and host of Videogame Nation
John Robertson (composer) (born 1943), New Zealand born Canadian composer
John Robertson (congressman) (1787–1873), politician and lawyer from Virginia
John Robertson (cricketer) (1809–1873), English cricketer
John Robertson (footballer, born 1884) (1884–1937), Scottish footballer, who played for Bolton Wanderers, Rangers and Southampton
John Robertson (footballer, born 1953), Scottish footballer, who played for Nottingham Forest and Scotland
John Robertson (footballer, born 1964), Scottish footballer, who played for and managed Heart of Midlothian
John Robertson (footballer, born 1974), English footballer, who played for Wigan Athletic and Lincoln City
John Robertson (footballer, born 1976), Scottish footballer, who played for Ayr United
John Robertson (footballer, born 2001), Scottish footballer, who plays for St Johnstone
John Robertson (Glasgow MP) (born 1952), former Labour Member of Parliament for Glasgow North West
John Robertson (Irish minister) (1868–1931), Irish Methodist
John Robertson (journalist) (1934–2014), hosted the interview portion of CBWT's 24Hours program in the late 1970s
John Robertson (mathematician) (1712–1776), English mathematician
John Robertson (Scottish minister) (1768–1843), Minister of Cambuslang, Scotland
John Robertson (New Zealand politician, born 1875) (1875–1952), New Zealand Social Democratic & Labour politician
John Robertson (New Zealand politician, born 1951), mayor of Papakura District, New Zealand
John Robertson (Nova Scotia politician) (1784–1872), MP in the Nova Scotia House of Assembly
John Robertson (Olympic sailor) (1929–2020), Canadian sailor
Sir John Robertson (ombudsman) (1925–2001), New Zealand Chief Ombudsman, 1986–1994
John Robertson (Paisley MP) (1913–1987), Labour Party MP 1961–1979, co-founder of the Scottish Labour Party
John Robertson (Paralympic sailor) (born 1972), British Paralympic sailor
John Robertson (pastoralist) (1808–1880), Scottish-born pastoralist in Australia
John Robertson (physicist) (born 1950), English physicist
John Robertson (politician, born 1962), former Labor leader in New South Wales and opposition leader
John Robertson (premier) (1816–1891), fifth Premier of New South Wales
Private John Robertson (born c. 1780), U.S. soldier, participant in the Lewis and Clark Expedition
John Ross Robertson (1841–1918), Canadian newspaper publisher, politician, and philanthropist in Toronto, Ontario
John S. Robertson (1878–1964), Canadian film director
John Tait Robertson (1877–1935), Scottish footballer, who played for Everton, Southampton and Rangers, and managed Chelsea
John W. Robertson (1912–1914), Australian rules football player
John Wylie Robertson (known as Wylie Watson; 1889–1966), British actor
Jon Robertson (born 1989), Scottish footballer
Jonathan Robertson (born 1991), Dutch soccer player
Joseph Clinton Robertson (c. 1787 – 1852), pseudonym Sholto Percy, Scottish patent agent and periodical editor
Joseph Gibb Robertson (1820–1899), Scottish-born merchant, farmer and political figure in Quebec
Joseph Robertson (historian) (1810–1866), Scottish scholar
Joseph Robertson (OHSU), president of Oregon Health & Science University
Joseph Robertson (pastor) (1849–1921), Australian Congregationalist minister
Joseph Robertson (priest) (1726–1802), English clergyman and writer
Julian Robertson (1932-2022), American investor and philanthropist
Julian Robertson (badminton) (born 1969), former English badminton player

K
Kaine Robertson (born 1980), Italian rugby player
Kathleen Robertson (born 1973), Canadian actress
Keith Robertson (writer) (1914–1991), American writer of children's books and murder mysteries
Keith Robertson (Scottish rugby union) (born 1954), former Scottish rugby union player
Keith Robertson (Australian footballer) (1938–2020), former Australian rules footballer
Keith Robertson (New Zealand rugby union), rugby player
Kenny Robertson (basketball), American basketball player
Kim Robertson (athlete) (born 1957), New Zealand sprinter
Kim Robertson (musician), American harpist
Kramer Robertson (born 1994), American baseball player

L
Lance Robertson, American musician, singer, DJ and actor
Leroy Robertson (1896–1971), American composer and music educator
Lloyd Robertson (born 1934), Canadian journalist

M
Margaret Hills (1882–1967), née Robertson, British teacher, suffragist organiser, feminist and socialist
Margaret Murray Robertson (1823–1897), Canadian teacher and writer
Margaret Shafto Robertson; (1848–1935) aka Madge Kendal was an English actress. 
Margi Robertson (born 1953), New Zealand fashion designer
Marion Thomson (1911–2007, née Robertson), New Zealand lawyer
Mark Robertson (soccer) (born 1977), Australian soccer player
 Mark Robertson (bassist), American musician and record producer
 Mark Robertson (rugby union) (born 1984), Scottish rugby union player
 Matthew Robertson (born 2001), Canadian ice hockey player
Max Robertson (1915–2009), English sports commentator
Michael Robertson (tennis) (born 1963), South African, later American tennis player
 Michael Robertson (discus thrower) (born 1983), American discus thrower
 Michael Robertson (rugby league) (born 1983), Australian rugby league footballer
 Michael Robertson (baseball), American college baseball coach
 Michael Robertson (skier) (born 1982), Australian Olympic skier
Michael Robertson (businessman) (born 1967), founder of MP3.com and Lindows.com
 Michael Robertson (filmmaker), Australian film director and producer
 Mick Robertson (born 1946), British children's TV presenter
Mike Robertson (baseball) (born 1970), Major League Baseball utility player
 Mike Robertson (snowboarder) (born 1985), Canadian snowboarder

N
Nancy Robertson (actress) (born 1971), Canadian actress
Nancy Robertson (diver) (born 1949), Canadian Olympic diver
Nancy Robertson (WRNS officer) (1909–2000), British Royal Navy officer
 Nate Robertson (born 1977), Major League Baseball player
 Neil Robertson (born 1982), Australian professional snooker player
Neil Robertson (mathematician) (born 1938), distinguished professor at Ohio State University
Nic Robertson (born 1962), CNN war reporter
Nicholas Robertson (ice hockey) (born 2001), American ice hockey player 
 Nick Robertson (businessman) (born 1967), British businessman, co-founder of ASOS.com
Nick Robertson (footballer) (born 1995), Australian rules footballer

O
 Oscar Robertson (born 1938), former professional basketball player
Oswald Hope Robertson (1886–1966), British-American medical scientist

P
P. L. Robertson (1879–1951), Canadian inventor of the Robertson screwdriver and screw  
Pat Robertson (born 1930), American media mogul, Southern Baptist minister, and college administrator
 Pat Robertson (footballer) (1895–1947), Australian rules footballer for Essendon
 Patrick Robertson, Lord Robertson (1794–1855), Scottish judge
 Patrick Robertson (soccer) (born 1986), American soccer player 
 Patrick Robertson (musician) (born 1977), Australian musician and songwriter
 Patrick Francis Robertson (1807–1885), British Member of Parliament for Hastings
 Patrick Robertson (set designer) (1922–2009), British theatre designer
Paul J. Robertson (born 1946), former Democratic member of the Indiana House of Representatives
Paul Robertson (animator) (born 1979), Australian animator known for pixelised animation work
Paul W. Robertson (1954–2014), Canadian businessperson, former president of Shaw Media
Pauline Robertson (born 1968), Scottish field hockey player
Percy Robertson (1868–1934), English watercolour landscape painter and etcher
 Persis Robertson (1896–1992), American artist
Pete Robertson (born 1992), American football linebacker
Peter Robertson (triathlete) (born 1976), Olympic triathlete from Australia
 Peter Robertson (politician), Canadian politician
 Peter Robertson (footballer, born 1875) (1875–1929), Scottish professional footballer who played as a half back
 Peter Robertson (golfer) (c. 1883–?), Scottish professional golfer
 Peter Robertson (Jamaica), planter and slave-owner in Jamaica
Phil Robertson (born 1946), founder of Duck Commander and co-star of Duck Dynasty
Philadelphia Nina Robertson (1866–1951), Australian Red Cross administrator
Philip Robertson (British Army officer) (1866–1936), British Army general
 Philip Robertson (chemist) (1884–1969), New Zealand chemist, university professor, and writer
Priscilla Robertson (1910–1989), American historian, author, and editor

R
R. H. Robertson (1849–1919), American architect
R. Paul Robertson, American endocrinologist
Rachael Robertson (television presenter), former British television continuity announcer and presenter
Rachael Robertson (writer) (born 1969), Australian author, expedition leader, and speaker
Rachel Robertson (born 1976), New Zealand field hockey player 
Rae Robertson (1893–1956), British pianist – see classical piano duo Bartlett and Robertson
Ralph Robertson (Australian footballer) (1881–1917), Australian rules footballer
Ralph Robertson (soccer), American soccer player
Ray Robertson, Canadian writer
Ray Robertson (athlete) (1901–1937), American Olympic sprinter
Raymond Robertson (politician), Scottish Conservative Party politician, former MP
Rich Robertson (left-handed pitcher) (born 1968), former Major League Baseball pitcher
Rich Robertson (right-handed pitcher) (born 1944), former Major League Baseball pitcher
Robbie Robertson (album), self-titled album by the musician
Robbie Robertson (comics), fictional character
Robbie Robertson, Miss Mississippi in 1966
Robie Robertson, awarded the Academy Award for Best Visual Effects for Marooned
 Robert Alexander Robertson (1873–1935), Scottish botanist
 Robert Chisholm Robertson (1861–1930), Scottish political activist
 Robert Gordon Robertson (1917–2013), Canadian politician
 Robert H. S. Robertson (1911–1999), Scottish chemist and mineralogist
 Robert Robertson (Nova Scotia politician) (1817–1901), Canadian politician
 Robert Robertson (Australian politician) (1887–1960)
 Robert Robertson (chemist) (1869–1949), Scottish chemist
 Robert Robertson (physician) (1742–1829), British physician, Fellow of the Royal Society
 Robert Robertson (field hockey) (born 1938), Rhodesian Olympic hockey player
 Robert Robertson (footballer) (fl. 1900s), Scottish footballer (St Mirren)
 Robert Robertson (actor) (1930–2001), Scottish actor and director
 Robert Robertson (Home and Away), a fictional character from Home and Away
 Robert S. Robertson (1839–1906), U.S. Army soldier and Medal of Honor recipient
Robertson brothers (pastoralists): John (died 1909), William (died 1914), Robert (1846–1928); cattle, horse and sheep breeders of South Australia
Roland Robertson (1938–2022), British sociologist and theorist of globalisation
Ronald Foote Robertson (1920–1991), British physician
Ronald Robertson (figure skater) (1937–2000), American figure skater
Ronald Robertson (politician) (1920–1998), politician in Manitoba, Canada

S
Sam Robertson (American football), American football coach with Southwestern Louisiana, 1980–1985
 Sam Robertson (skier), Australian alpine ski racer
 Samuel Matthews Robertson (1852–1911), American politician
Sandy Robertson (footballer, born 1860), Scottish football player for Preston North End
Sandy Robertson (footballer, born 1878)
Sandy Robertson (footballer, born 1971), Scottish football player for Rangers
Sawnie Robertson (1850–1892), Texas Supreme Court justice 
Scott Robertson (rugby union) (born 1974), New Zealand rugby coach
Scott Robertson (footballer, born 1985), Scottish football player (Dundee United, Hibernian)
Scott Robertson (footballer, born 1987), Scottish football player (Queen of the South, Partick Thistle, Stranraer)
Scott Robertson (footballer, born 2001), Scottish football player (Celtic)
Scott Robertson (diver) (born 1987), Australian diver
Scotty Robertson (1930–2011), American basketball coach
Sherman Robertson (1948–2021), American blues guitarist and singer
Stanley Robertson, physicist who proposed the concept of magnetospheric eternally collapsing objects
Stanley Robertson (folk singer) (1940–2009), Scottish folk singer and storyteller
Stephen Robertson (computer scientist), British computer scientist
Stephen Robertson (footballer) (born 1977), Scottish football goalkeeper
Stephen Robertson (politician) (born 1962), Australian politician
Sterling C. Robertson (1785–1842), Empresario under Mexican Texas, settled Robertson's Colony
Steve Robertson (actor), of Scotland the What? fame
 Steve Robertson (racing driver) (born 1964), English racing driver
Stewart Robertson (born 1948), Scottish composer
Steven Robertson (born 1977), Scottish actor
Stokes Robertson Jr. (1913–2006), Justice of the Supreme Court of Mississippi
Stuart A. Robertson (1918–2005), co-founder of Milliman, Inc., an actuarial and business consulting firm
Stuart Robertson (gardener) (1944–2009), professional gardener from Montreal, Quebec
Stuart Robertson (footballer born 1946), English footballer who played centre half
Stuart Robertson (cricketer) (born 1947), former Zimbabwean first-class cricketer
Stuart Robertson (footballer, born 1959) (born 1959), Scottish footballer who played in the Football League and the Scottish Football League

T
T. A. Robertson (1909–1994), Scottish MI5 intelligence officer
Ted Z. Robertson (1921–2017), Texas Supreme Court justice
Thomas A. Robertson (1848–1892), U.S. Representative from Kentucky
Thomas Alexander Robertson (1909–1973), better known by his pen name of "Vagaland", Shetland poet
Thomas Atholl Robertson (1874–1955), Scottish politician, Liberal MP for Finchley 1923–24
Thomas B. Robertson (1779–1828), U.S. Representative from Louisiana
Thomas Bolling Robertson (born 1950), American diplomat, ambassador to Slovenia 2004–2008
Thomas Campbell Robertson (1789–1863), British civil servant in India
Thomas Chalmers Robertson (1907–1989), author, ecologist and conservationist from South Africa
Thomas Graham Robertson, Lord Robertson (1881–1944), Scottish advocate
Thomas Herbert Robertson (1849–1916), British politician, Conservative MP for Hackney South
Thomas J. Robertson (1823–1897), U.S. Senator from South Carolina
Thomas Dolby (Thomas Morgan Robertson, born 1958), musician
Thomas Robertson (minister) (died 1799), co-founder of the Royal Society of Edinburgh
Thomas Robertson (priest) (1532–1559), Anglican Archdeacon of Leicester and Dean of Durham
Thomas Robertson (Australian politician) (1830–1891), New South Wales politician
Thomas Robertson (Nova Scotia politician) (1852–1902), Canadian politician, Member of Parliament from Nova Scotia 
Thomas Robertson (Ontario politician) (1827–1905), Canadian politician, Member of Parliament from Ontario
Thomas Robertson (footballer, born 1864) (1864–1924), Scottish footballer (Queen's Park FC and Scotland)
 Thomas Robertson (footballer, born 1875) (1875–1923), Scottish footballer who played for Stoke, Liverpool and Southampton
 Thomas S. Robertson, Scottish-born American professor of marketing
Thomas William Robertson (1829–1871), English dramatist and stage director
 Tom Robertson (Australian footballer) (1876–1942), Australian rules footballer
 Tom Robertson (rugby union) (born 1994), Australian rugby union football player
 Tom Robertson (Scottish footballer) (1908–1962), Scottish footballer (Ayr United, Dundee, Clyde)
 Tommy Robertson (1876–1941), Scottish international footballer

V
Vernon Robertson (1890–1971), British civil engineer

W
Dr W. G. Aitchison Robertson (c. 1865 – 1946), British expert on medical jurisprudence
Walter M. Robertson (1888–1954), United States Army officer
 Walter S. Robertson, United States Assistant Secretary of State for Far Eastern Affairs 1953–1959
 Walter W. Robertson (1845–1907), 19th-century Scottish architect
William A. Robertson (1837–1889), American state legislator in Louisiana
William Albert Robertson (1885–1942), Scottish rugby union international, doctor and soldier
William Archibald Robertson (1832–1926), prospector and Scottish-born political figure in British Columbia
William B. Robertson (1893–1943), American aviator and aviation executive
William Bruce Robertson (1820–1886), Scottish Secession/United Presbyterian Church minister
William Charles Fleming Robertson (1867–1937), British Governor of Barbados
William E. Robertson, American baseball commissioner
William H. Robertson (1823–1898), American lawyer and politician from New York
William Henry Roberston (1810–1897), English physician
William J. Robertson (1817–1898), American jurist from Virginia
William Robertson (Western Quebec and Upper Canada) (c. 1760 – 1806), Scottish-born entrepreneur and colonial-era political figure
William Robertson (Nova Scotia), Scottish-descended merchant and political figure in Canadian colonies 
William Robertson, Lord Robertson (1753–1853), Scottish lawyer
William Robertson (Australian politician) (1839–1892), barrister and politician in colonial Victoria, Australia
William Robertson (footballer, born 1874) (1874 – after 1904), Scottish inside forward or wing half
William Robertson (footballer, born 1907) (1907–1980), Scottish full back with Stoke City, Manchester United and Reading
William Robertson (1880s footballer) (fl. 1887), Scottish footballer
William Robertson (Canterbury cricketer) (1864–1912), New Zealand cricketer, played for Canterbury 1894–1901
Sir William Robertson, 1st Baronet (1860–1933), British Army officer
William Robertson (VC) (1865–1949), Scottish sergeant-major and Victoria Cross recipient
William Robertson (died 1914), of Robertson brothers (pastoralists), pioneers of South Australia
William Robertson (historian) (1721–1793), Scottish writer and academic
William Robertson (Irish architect) (1770–1850), Irish architect with Scottish roots
William Robertson (architect) (1786–1841), Scottish architect
William Robertson (Irish priest) (1705–1783), Irish clergyman, theological writer and schoolmaster
William Robertson (antiquary) (1740–1803), Scottish historian and antiquary
William Robertson (statistician) (1818–1882), Scottish physician, statistician and amateur photographer
William Robertson (Australian settler) (1798–1874), Scottish-born pioneer in Tasmania and Victoria
William Robertson (Hebraist) (fl. 1650–1680), Scottish Hebraist
William Robertson (Otago cricketer) (born 1940), New Zealand cricketer, played for Otago 1960–61
William Robertson (MCC cricketer) (William Parish Robertson, 1879–1950), English cricketer, played for Middlesex County Cricket Club (MCC) 1900–19
William Robertson (Jersey cricketer) (born 1998), English cricketer who plays for Jersey
William Robertson (Ontario) (1897–1948), Canadian politician in the Legislative Assembly of Ontario
William "Rip" Robertson (1920–1970), American covert agent
William Russell Robertson (1853–1930), Canadian politician in the Legislative Assembly of British Columbia
William Tindal Robertson (1825–1889), English Member of Parliament for Brighton, 1886–1889
William W. Robertson (1941–2008), American lawyer, U.S. Attorney for District of New Jersey
Willie Robertson (born 1972), American TV personality and outdoorsman, known for the reality TV series Duck Dynasty
Willie Robertson (footballer) (born 1993), Scottish footballer
Wyndham Robertson (1803–1888), Governor of Virginia

See also
 Clan Robertson
 Forbes-Robertson
 Robertson (given name)
 Roberson (surname)
 Robeson (disambiguation)
 Robson (surname)
 Robison (name)
 Robinson (name)
 Roberts (surname)
 Robert (surname)

References

Surnames of English origin
Surnames of Lowland Scottish origin
Scottish surnames
English-language surnames
Patronymic surnames
Surnames from given names